Markku Yrjö Eestilä (born 23 July 1956 in Iisalmi) is a Finnish politician currently serving in the Parliament of Finland for the National Coalition Party at the Savonia-Karelia constituency.

References

1956 births
Living people
People from Iisalmi
National Coalition Party politicians
Members of the Parliament of Finland (2011–15)
Members of the Parliament of Finland (2015–19)
Members of the Parliament of Finland (2019–23)